Clavus papilio is a species of sea snail, a marine gastropod mollusk in the family Drilliidae.

Description
The length of the shell attains 12 mm.

Distribution
This marine species occurs off Zululand, South Africa

References

 Kilburn R.N. (1988). Turridae (Mollusca: Gastropoda) of southern Africa and Mozambique. Part 4. Subfamilies Drillinae, Crassispirinae and Strictispirinae. Annals of the Natal Museum. 29(1): 167–320. page(s): 190, figs 7, 97-100

Endemic fauna of South Africa
papilio
Gastropods described in 1988